Kelineh (also Romanized as Kelīneh and Kolīneh) is a village in Howmeh-ye Sarpol Rural District, in the Central District of Sarpol-e Zahab County, Kermanshah Province, Iran. At the 2006 census, its population was 117, in 30 families.

References 

Populated places in Sarpol-e Zahab County